Komninos Zervos (born 1950) is a Greek-Australian performance poet and teacher. He was born in Richmond, Melbourne.

Life

Born in Melbourne in 1950, Komninos Zervos currently lives in Melbourne, Australia.

Komninos' poems are a playful combination of social commentary, autobiography and farce. He has performed poetry professionally in pubs, literary festivals, TV, radio, schools, streets, universities and prisons; published poetry in books, literary journals and anthologies; and authored animated and interactive multimedia poems for the internet. He is the recipient of numerous grants.

Awards
 1991 Australian Human Rights and Equal Opportunity Commission Poetry Award for Komninos
 1992 Australia Council/Ros Bower Community Artist of the Year.
 1997 Prix Ars Electronica, Austria, .Net Award, Highly Commended.
 2001 Electronic Literature Organisation Literature Award for poetry, Runner-up.

Bibliography
 the komninos manifesto. (Fat Possum, 1985)
 the second komninos manifesto. (Fat Possum, 1986)
 the last komninos manifesto. (Koala Munga, 1987)
 high street, kew east. (Collins/Angus and Robertson, 1990). illust. Diana Reynolds.
 komninos. (UQP, 1991)
 the baby rap and other poems. (Oxford University Press, 1992). illust. Peter Viska.
 komninos by the kupful. (UQP, 1994)
 exercises in surrealism . (Koala Munga, 2008)
 manifesto 2008 - 2009. (Koala Munga, 2009)

Articles on Komninos
 Geoff Page's A Reader's Guide to Australian Poetry, UQP, 1995, pages 161 - 164.
 William Wilde's Australian Poets and their Works: A reader's guide, Oxford, 1996, pages 140 - 141.
 Wilde, Hooton and Andrews The Oxford Companion to Australian Literature, 2nd edition, Oxford,1994, page 439.

Notes

External links
 CyberPoetry Website Archive
 komninos's website
 Underground, Website
 Archive of Video and Audio performances and interviews

1950 births
20th-century Australian poets
Australian people of Greek descent
Living people
21st-century Australian poets
Australian male poets
20th-century Australian male writers
21st-century Australian male writers